Veronika Vitenberg (born September 9, 1988, in Grodno, Byelorussian SSR) is an Israeli rhythmic gymnast who competed in the 2008 Olympics.

Career
Vitenberg started rhythmic gymnastics at age 6 in Belarus, after her schoolteacher encouraged her to enroll because of her high flexibility. At the age of 13, she immigrated to Israel.

Vitenberg competed for Israel at the 2008 Summer Olympics in Beijing and was a member of the rhythmic gymnastics team that placed 6th in the group final.

Personal life
Vitenberg is Jewish. She served in the Israel Defense Forces from 2007 to 2010 and received an "Athlete of Excellence" status, allowing her to continue training. She went through recruit training at Batar Nitzanim and then served at the HaKirya base in Tel Aviv.

In 2009, she began to study for a B.A. degree in business management at the Interdisciplinary Center in Herzliya.

Competition results
2004 Israel Championships (2nd, individual)
2006 European Championships (6th, team)
2007 European Championships (4th, team)
2007 World Championships (6th, team)
2008 Olympic Games (6th, team)
2009 World Championships (5th, team)

See also
 Sports in Israel
 Linoy Ashram
 Nicol Zelikman
 Neta Rivkin
 Irina Risenzon

References

External links

 
 Veronika Vitenberg Official website (archived)
 Games of the 29th Olympiad Beijing (CHN) August 8-24, 2008 Rhythmic Gymnastics at GymnasticsResults.com
 Get to know the representative: National Rhythmic Gymnastic Team at liga.co.il (archived)
 watch the national team finish in 6th place: "Like a medal" at Sport 5 (archived)
 Rhythmic Gymnastic: Israel finished 5th in Europe at Ynet

Israeli rhythmic gymnasts
Gymnasts at the 2008 Summer Olympics
Olympic gymnasts of Israel
Living people
Belarusian emigrants to Israel
1988 births
Sportspeople from Grodno
Sportspeople from Tel Aviv
Jewish gymnasts
Israeli Jews
21st-century Belarusian Jews
Belarusian rhythmic gymnasts